HP ZBook is a brand of mobile workstations made by HP Inc. Introduced in September 2013, it is a successor to HP's previous mobile workstations in the HP EliteBook series. The ZBook mainly competes against PCs such as Dell's Precision and Lenovo's ThinkPad P Series.

Features 

The HP ZBook workstations feature Nvidia Quadro and AMD FirePro ISV-certified graphics cards and Thunderbolt connectivity. Display options include a touch-sensitive screen on the ZBook 14 and an HP DreamColor IPS panel on the ZBook 17. Additionally, a 3200×1800 resolution option has been announced for the ZBook 15.

History

 2013: September 10: ZBook 14, ZBook 15 and ZBook 17 announced. 
 2014: September 8: ZBook 15 G2 and ZBook 17 G2 announced. 
 2015: January 5: ZBook 14 G2 and ZBook 15u G2; November 11: ZBook 15u G3, ZBook Studio G3, ZBook 15 G3 and ZBook 17 G3 announced.
 2017: April 21: ZBook 14u G4, ZBook 15u G4, ZBook Studio G4, ZBook 15 G4 and ZBook 17 G4; October 18: ZBook x2 G4 announced.
 2018: February 7: ZBook 14u G5 and ZBook 15u G5; April 5: ZBook 15v G5, ZBook Studio G5, ZBook Studio x360 G5, ZBook 15 G5 and ZBook 17 G5 announced.
 2019: April 16: ZBook 14u G6 and ZBook 15u G6; May 27: ZBook 15 G6 and ZBook 17 G6 announced.
 2020: April 16: ZBook Create and ZBook Studio G7; May 26: ZBook Firefly 14 G7 and ZBook Firefly 15 G7 announced. September 1: ZBook Fury 15 G7, ZBook Fury 17 G7 and ZBook Power G7
 2020: December 7: ZBook Firefly 14 and 15 G8 launched
 2022: May 12: HP announced the G9 line-up including 4 members: Firefly, Studio, Power, and Fury.

Models

First generation 
The ZBook family originally comprised the following models:
 ZBook 14: 14.0" workstation Ultrabook
 ZBook 15: 15.6" workstation
 ZBook 17: 17.3" workstation

All models featured Intel Haswell dual- and quad-core processors, AMD and Nvidia professional graphics and up to 32 GB of RAM, except for the ZBook 14, which was limited to 16 GB of RAM.

The ZBook 15 and ZBook 17 use Intel Socket G3 except for the ZBook 14 which has the processor soldered-on.

Specifications

Second generation 
The second generation comprised the following models:
 ZBook 14 G2: 14.0" workstation Ultrabook
 ZBook 15u G2: 15.6" workstation Ultrabook
 ZBook 15 G2: 15.6" workstation
 ZBook 17 G2: 17.3" workstation

The ZBook 15 G2 and ZBook 17 G2 models were announced in September 2014 and included new Intel processors, AMD and Nvidia graphics, and Thunderbolt 2 connectivity.

The ZBook 15 G2 and ZBook 17 G2 use Intel Socket G3 except for the ZBook 14 G2 and ZBook 15u G2 which have the processor soldered-on.

Specifications

Third generation 
The third generation comprised the following models:

 ZBook Studio G3: 15.6" workstation Ultrabook
 ZBook 15u G3: 15.6" workstation Ultrabook
 ZBook 15 G3: 15.6" workstation
 ZBook 17 G3: 17.3" workstation

All models were announced in November 2015. Features include Intel Skylake Core and Xeon family processors, AMD FirePro and Nvidia Quadro graphics, and Thunderbolt 3. ZBook Studio G3 is the world's first quad core workstation Ultrabook. HP ZBook Dock with Thunderbolt 3 announced with those models can link up to 10 devices at once.

Specifications

Fourth generation 
The following fourth-generation models are either discontinued or have been replaced by fifth-generation models:

ZBook x2 G4: 14.0" workstation with detachable keyboard (2-in-1). Has similar performance specification to the 14u.
 ZBook 14u G4: 14.0" workstation Ultrabook
 ZBook Studio G4: 15.6" workstation Ultrabook
 ZBook 15u G4: 15.6" workstation Ultrabook
 ZBook 15 G4: 15.6" workstation
 ZBook 17 G4: 17.3" workstation

All models featured Intel Kaby Lake dual- and quad-core processors, AMD and Nvidia professional graphics, up to 64 GB of RAM, and Thunderbolt 3. The ZBook 14u and 15u feature a mixture of dual-core Kaby Lake and quad-core Intel eighth-generation Kaby Lake R processors.

Specifications

Fifth generation 
The following fifth-generation models are either discontinued or have been replaced by sixth-generation models:

 ZBook 14u G5: 14.0" workstation Ultrabook
 ZBook 15u G5: 15.6" workstation Ultrabook
ZBook Studio G5: 15.6" workstation targeted at creative industry. Prioritises higher display specifications (colour gamut, resolution etc.).
ZBook Studio x360 G5: 15.6" convertible workstation. Similar to the Studio G5, but with a 360 degree hinge, and the option for a touchscreen.
ZBook 15v G5: 15.6" workstation with a lower price point than the 15, but with similar features and performance to the 15.
 ZBook 15 G5: 15.6" workstation
 ZBook 17 G5: 17.3" workstation

Specifications

Sixth generation 

This generation of ZBook notebooks feature Intel Whiskey Lake quad-core CPU with integrated Intel Gen9 GPU and optional AMD Polaris 23 GPU for lightweight models, and Intel Coffee Lake R quad-core, hexa-core or octa-core CPU with integrated Intel Gen9 GPU and optional Nvidia Turing GPU for performance models. This generation also made Wi-Fi 6 available for ZBook products for the first time. All models continue to use the fifth-generation chassis design.

ZBook 14u G6: 14.0" lightweight workstation
ZBook 15u G6: 15.6" lightweight workstation
ZBook 15 G6: 15.6" performance workstation
ZBook 17 G6: 17.3" performance workstation

Specifications

Seventh generation 

This generation of ZBook notebooks feature Intel Comet Lake CPU with integrated Intel Gen9 GPU and optional Nvidia GPU.

ZBook Firefly 14 G7: 14.0" lightweight workstation
ZBook Firefly 15 G7: 15.6" lightweight workstation
ZBook Create G7: 15.6" performance workstation
ZBook Studio G7: 15.6" performance workstation
ZBook Power 15 G7: 15.6" performance workstation
ZBook Fury 15 G7: 15.6" performance workstation
ZBook Fury 17 G7: 17.3" performance workstation
ZBook Power 17 G7: 17.3" performance workstation

Specifications

Eighth generation 

This generation of ZBook Firefly notebooks feature Intel Tiger Lake CPU with Gen12 (Xe) Graphics, optional Nvidia T500 GPU and optional Qualcomm Snapdragon X55 5G WWAN.

ZBook Firefly 14 G8: 14.0" lightweight workstation
ZBook Firefly 15 G8: 15.6" lightweight workstation

Ninth generation 

This generation of ZBook notebooks features Intel Alder Lake CPU with integrated Intel Xe GPU and optional Nvidia GPU

ZBook Power 15 G9: 15.6" performance workstation 
ZBook Studio 16 G9: 16" performance workstation 
ZBook Fury 16 G9: 16" performance workstation 
ZBook Firefly 14 G9: 14" lightweight workstation 
ZBook Firefly 16 G9: 16" lightweight workstation

See also 

 HP EliteBook
 Dell Precision
 ThinkPad P series and W series
 List of Hewlett-Packard products

References

Further reading

External links
 HP Mobile Workstations

Zbook
Consumer electronics brands
Computer-related introductions in 2013
Mobile workstations